The International Order of Saint Luke is an international, inter-denominational, Christian healing organization. It began in 1932 as the Fellowship of St. Luke, and was founded by John Gaynor Banks, an Episcopal priest.

The Order is ecumenical, with members belonging to a variety of Christian denominations.

The Order is international, with a presence not only in the United States, but also in Canada, Belize, Jamaica, the United Kingdom, Australia, New Zealand and India. Outside of North America, it is organized by country. In Greater North America, it is a single entity.  

Members engage in healing prayer with those who are physically ill, emotionally troubled or in other distress, often with the laying on of hands. Members may be clergy or laypeople, Ministry by members of the Order is seen and experienced as an extension, but not a replacement for other parts of Christian religious observance and practice.  Healing Communities, or groups of members of the Order, meet together regularly to study Scripture and engage in prayer.

There are hundreds of healing communities within this organization in the United States, Canada, Belize, and Jamaica.

Preamble of the Order
The New Testament reveals that healing is an essential part of the teaching and practice of our Lord Jesus Christ, and that he commissions his followers to preach the gospel of the kingdom and to heal the sick.

The Order of St Luke the Physician comprises clergy and laity of the Christian church who believe that the Holy Scriptures set forth healing as a continuing and essential part of the ministry committed to the church by Jesus Christ. Members of the Order are called to make the ministry of healing a regular part of their Christian life.

WE AFFIRM THAT:
the foundation of belief and practice in the Order is the doctrine of the Trinity;
God's intention for his creation is perfect;
sin is the root cause of all disharmony within people, between people and in the universe;
the perfect will of God is complete redemption from sin, sickness and all consequences of the fall;
the basis of this redemption, including healing, is that reconciliation with the Father accomplished by Jesus Christ once for all on the cross;
the Holy Spirit makes personally effective what the risen, ascended and everliving Christ has accomplished;
faith in Jesus Christ is the only means whereby this redemption is appropriated;
wholeness of spirit, soul and body rather than physical healing alone is the goal of the Order;
this wholeness usually involves co-operation between members of the church and members of the medical and paramedical professions; and
the Order is committed to supporting or initiating such cooperation.

Emblem of the Order
The emblem of the Order is blue in the form of a cross within a circle, which together make an acrostic. Blue is the symbolic colour of healing, associated with restful and calming properties.

The Latin motto:
JESU 		ESTO 		MIHI 		JESUS
LUX 		REX 		DUX		LEX
means:
O Jesus, 	be 		to me 		my Saviour (Healer),	
Light		King		Leader		Law

According to tradition, this cross was found in the catacombs of Domitilla in Rome during the second century. It is the prayer discovered by a Roman nobleman, whose wife had been the guide and inspiration of his life. When she died, he felt the light of his life had been extinguished. Restless and distraught, he wandered aimlessly until he heard the Christian gospel and found the prayer inscribed on the wall of the catacombs. He accepted Christ and made this prayer the rule of his life.

OSL New Zealand (Australasia)

Chaplains for New Zealand (Australasia)

Senior Chaplains for New Zealand (Australasia)

Wardens for the Order in New Zealand (Australasia)

OSL Canada

OSL Canada was launched in Winnipeg, during August 2011, at the First OSL Canadian National Healing Conference.

More than 80 enthusiastic OSL supporters from across Canada and several from the USA attended the four day healing conference at the Mennonite University in Winnipeg, Manitoba.  Delegates were treated to a wealth of keynote addresses and workshops on several aspects of Christian healing.  A vote taken at the business meeting resulted in OSL Canada being launched!

OSL Canada will remain a faithful and important partner with The International Order of St Luke the Physician, the North America organization headquartered in San Antonio, Texas.  OSL Canada will serve the Canadian network of OSL Members and Chapters with communications specific to Canadian interest and activities.  Our mission is to return the healing ministry of Jesus to its place in the church, to be a resource for individuals and clergy who want to learn more about offering healing during worship services and developing healing prayer ministry teams.  Our mandate is to bring the power and healing grace of our Lord and Saviour, Jesus Christ, to individual lives.  OSL Canada is poised to make a valuable contribution to the ministry of Christian healing, and to the growth of the Order of St Luke in North America.

References

Further reading 

 
  at page=50
 
 
 
 
 
  Republished as 
 
 
  Republished as

External links
 The International Order of Saint Luke the Physician
 The Order of St. Luke the Physician in Australia
 Order of St. Luke the Physician in New Zealand
 The Order of St. Luke the Physician in UK
 List of OSL healng communities outside the USA

1932 establishments in the United States
New Thought organizations
Prayer
Luke the Physician
Supernatural healing